Portishead is the second studio album by English electronic music band Portishead, released on 16 September 1997 by Go! Discs. The album cover is a still image from the music video of the song "All Mine".

Music 
With Portishead, the band chose to eschew sampling other records, which had been a defining feature of their debut album Dummy. Instead, they created original pieces which they weaved into the songs, resulting in a more textured sound. The only song to employ samples was "Only You", which incorporates elements of Ken Thorne's "Inspector Clouseau" and The Pharcyde's "She Said". "Western Eyes" is listed as sampling "Hookers & Gin" by the Sean Atkins Experience in the album's liner notes. In reality, this song does not exist; like most of the samples on the album, it was created by the band.

Release 
Released in September 1997, the album reached  2 on the UK Albums Chart and No. 21 on the Billboard 200.

On 3 December 2008, Universal Music Japan re-released Dummy and Portishead as a limited SHM-CD version.

Reception

Portishead received critical acclaim upon its release. Spin praised the record and noted that the band created a "gothic", "deadly" and "trippy" atmosphere. Commenting on the textures of the music, music journalist Barry Walters observed that the group got "darker, deeper and more disturbing" in comparison to their previous effort Dummy.

Year-end lists

(*) designates unordered lists.

Track listing

Credits
All songs produced by Geoff Barrow, Adrian Utley, Beth Gibbons and Dave McDonald.

Portishead
 Beth Gibbons – vocals
 Adrian Utley – guitar (tracks 1, 2, 4, 5, 7-10), bass (tracks 2, 4, 5, 7, 9), synthesizer (tracks 4, 6), Rhodes piano (track 9), piano (track 11)
 Geoff Barrow – drums (tracks 4, 5, 9), turntables, programming, samples

Additional musicians
 Clive Deamer – drums (tracks 1, 6, 7, 11), addidional drums (track 3)
 Shaun Atkins – additional vocals (tracks 1, 11)
 John Baggot – organ (track 9), piano (track 10)
 Andy Hague  – horns (track 2)
 Ben Waghorn – horns (track 2)
 John Cornick – horns (track 2), trombone (track 7)
 S. Cooper – violin (track 4)

Charts

Weekly charts

Year-end charts

Certifications and sales

References

External links
Portishead Info

1997 albums
Albums produced by Geoff Barrow
London Records albums
Portishead (band) albums